Club Deportivo y Social Constitución Unido is a Chilean football club based in Constitución, Chile.

The club was founded on February 18, 1998, and played for nine years in Tercera División A and 16 seasons in Segunda División de Chile.

See also
Chilean football league system

Stadium 
Estadio Enrique Donn Müller
Estadio Mutrún, Constitución

Football clubs in Chile
Association football clubs established in 1998
1998 establishments in Chile